Consall railway station is a former passenger railway station of the North Staffordshire Railway (NSR) and is now a preserved station on the Churnet Valley Railway in Staffordshire, England.

History

Consall station, situated on the Churnet Valley Line of the NSR, was opened to both passengers and goods on 3 March 1902. The station was a quiet country station serving the needs of workers involved in the forge and nearby lime kilns. It was however, opened mainly for the small, nearby village. As with many stations in the 1960s, passenger numbers decreased to such an extent that the station was closed in 1965.

Re-opening, and the Churnet Valley Railway
During the 1970s a railway preservation base was set up at nearby Cheddleton station. This was later to become the base of the Churnet Valley Railway. The CVR had been slowly progressing in preserving the line when in the late 1990s they had reached the station site.

The down (western) platform was still in existence but without any platform edging stones. These were replaced and this platform opened for passengers 11 July 1998. Construction later began on the replica station buildings which opened on 3 March 2002.

The second track running through the station, which had served as a run-round loop, was made redundant when the line was extended to Froghall, so work began on resignalling this loop to allow two train operation on the line. This involved the addition of signals and a signal box to the station (the original line was double track throughout, so no box was ever located at Consall).

To finish, the wooden up (eastern) platform was reconstructed so that the original 1902 shelter could be put back into use and so passing trains had a platform to call in the up direction.

This platform was opened on 22 April 2005 and now the station is relatively complete and is the nerve centre of train operations on peak days due to the new passing loop and signal box.

Notes

External links
Churnet Valley Railway homepage

Heritage railway stations in Staffordshire
Staffordshire Moorlands
Former North Staffordshire Railway stations
Beeching closures in England
Railway stations in Great Britain opened in 1902
Railway stations in Great Britain closed in 1965